The 1979 European Junior Badminton Championships was the 6th tournament of the European Junior Badminton Championships. It was held in Mülheim, Germany, in the month of April. Danish players won four titles, both the singles and Mixed doubles and Mixed team championships. While Sweden bagged boys' doubles title and England the girls' doubles gold.

Medalists

Final results

Medal table

References 

European Junior Badminton Championships
European Junior Badminton Championships
European Junior Badminton Championships
European Junior Badminton Championships
International sports competitions hosted by West Germany